Bob Walker (20 April 1912 – 25 March 1997) was an  Australian rules footballer who played with Geelong in the Victorian Football League (VFL).

Notes

External links 

1912 births
1997 deaths
Australian rules footballers from Victoria (Australia)
Geelong Football Club players
Barwon Football Club players